Gentleman Chris may refer to:

 Gentleman Chris Adams (1955-2001), an  English wrestler
 Christian Christensen (boxer) (1926-2005), a Danish boxer known as Gentleman Chris